Deadly Inheritance, is a 1969 Italian giallo film directed by Vittorio Sindoni.

Plot
An old man named Oscar is "accidentally" run over by a train in France. According to his will, his heirs must wait until the youngest among them (a simpleton named Janot) reaches the age of 21 before the estate can be settled. Janot unfortunately soon after turns up dismembered by a train as well, in another "accident". Then Rosalie and her husband meet untimely deaths, which calls the affair to the attention of a police inspector. A young family member named Collette is next on the killer's list.

Cast

Production
Director Vittorio Sindoni stated that the film was initially set to film in France, but ended on location in Anguillara Sabazia, just outside of Rome. The director stated they had tried to pass off the location as Aix-les-Bains. Film critic and historian Roberto Curti stated that the film was low budget and barely had time to complete and mix the film.

Release
Before the film's initial release, the Italian rating board  rejected it in January 1968 due to scenes of Femi Benussi nude. It was only distributed the following year in 1969.
The film was later re-released as L'assassino ha le mani pulite  on home video in the early 1980s.

References

Footnotes

Sources

External links

1969 films
Giallo films
1960s Italian-language films
Films directed by Vittorio Sindoni
1960s Italian films